The 2017–18 DPR Korea Premier Football League was the first season of the reformed DPR Korea Premier Football League, the top North Korean association football league, to use a home-and-away format. The league started on 1 December 2017 and will continue until 28 October 2018. Matches will be played on Saturdays and Sundays only.

April 25 are the defending champions.

Teams
A total of 13 teams will participate:

Standings

Results

Awards
2017–18 Awards were given at 31 October 2018
Most Valuable Player : Kim Yu-sŏng (April 25)
Top scorer : An Il-bŏm (April 25)
Best goalkeeper : An Tae-sŏng (April 25)

References

See also
DPRK Premier League at its height
Wolmido beats Sobaeksu 2–0 in premier league
Results of 2017–2018 DPRK Premier Football League

External links
DPR Korea Football
North Korea 2017/18, RSSSF.com
Naenara

DPR Korea Football League seasons
1
1
Korea, North